Osilo is a comune (municipality) in the Province of Sassari in the Italian region Sardinia, located about  north of Cagliari and about  east of Sassari. It is part of  the Anglona traditional region. 
The municipality of Osilo contains the frazioni (subdivisions, mainly villages and hamlets) Santa Vittoria and San Lorenzo.

Osilo borders the following municipalities: Cargeghe, Codrongianos, Muros, Nulvi, Ploaghe, Sassari, Sennori, Tergu.

Economy is mostly based on agriculture and animal husbandry, especially of sheep, which include about 250 dairy companies.  It is the production center of the Osilo pecorino cheese. Sights include a castle and several churches.

References

Cities and towns in Sardinia